Garfam (also Romanized as Garfan) is a village in Howmeh Rural District, in the Central District of Rasht County, Gilan Province, Iran. At the 2006 census, its population was 535, in 152 families.

References 

Populated places in Rasht County